The Viper is a 1938 British slapstick comedy film directed by Roy William Neill and starring Claude Hulbert, Betty Lynne and Hal Walters.  The film was a sequel to the previous year's very successful The Vulture, with Hulbert and Walters reprising their roles as hapless private detective Cedric Gull and his sidekick Stiffy respectively. Lesley Brook also features in both films, but in unrelated roles. Directorial duties passed to Neill as Ralph Ince, the director of The Vulture, had been killed in a road accident shortly after the film's release.

Cast
 Claude Hulbert as Cedric Gull
 Betty Lynne as Gaby Toulong
 Hal Walters as Stiffy Mason
 Lesley Brook as Jenny
 Fred Groves as Inspector Bradlaw
 Dino Galvani as The Viper
 Boris Ranevski as Carlos
 Harvey Braban as Jagger
 Reginald Purdell as Announcer

Reception
The Viper fared significantly less well than The Vulture both critically and commercially. The film was not the box-office success its predecessor had been, and it was suggested that cinemagoers were beginning to tire of Hulbert's disguises and slapstick routines.  Reviews were almost entirely negative in tone. Kine Weekly observed that the film held little appeal other than to Hulbert's die-hard fans and that "considerable expense has apparently gone in the production of gadgets and stunts for this picture which would have been better devoted to a more humorous story and funnier dialogue".  The Monthly Film Bulletin found the film "absurd and confusing...the slapstick episodes are embarrassing".

No print of The Viper is known to survive, and the film is included on the British Film Institute's "75 Most Wanted" list of missing British feature films.

References

External links
 BFI 75 Most Wanted entry, with extensive notes
 

1938 films
1938 comedy films
British comedy films
British black-and-white films
Films directed by Roy William Neill
Lost British films
British sequel films
1938 lost films
Lost comedy films
Warner Bros. films
Films shot at Teddington Studios
1930s British films